The Frank J. Rademacher House is a historic house in Crete, Nebraska. It was built in 1894 by Frank Joseph Rademacher, a German immigrant, and his wife, Mary Pavlik, an immigrant from Bohemia (now the Czech Republic). Rademacher sold furniture and carpets, and he was the vice president of the Crete Loan and Savings Company. The house was designed in the Queen Anne architectural style. It has been listed on the National Register of Historic Places since March 11, 1980.

References

Czech-American culture in Nebraska
German-American culture in Nebraska
Houses completed in 1894
National Register of Historic Places in Saline County, Nebraska
Queen Anne architecture in Nebraska